Armadillos (meaning "little armored ones" in Spanish) are New World placental mammals in the order Cingulata. The Chlamyphoridae and Dasypodidae are the only surviving families in the order, which is part of the superorder Xenarthra, along with the anteaters and sloths. Nine extinct genera and 21 extant species of armadillo have been described, some of which are distinguished by the number of bands on their armor. All species are native to the Americas, where they inhabit a variety of different environments. 
 
Armadillos are characterized by a leathery armor shell and long, sharp claws for digging. They have short legs, but can move quite quickly. When threatened by a predator, Tolypeutes species frequently roll up into a ball; they are the only species of armadillo capable of this.

Etymology
The word armadillo means "little armored one" in Spanish. The Aztecs called them āyōtōchtli , Nahuatl for "turtle-rabbit": āyōtl  (turtle) and tōchtli  (rabbit). The Portuguese word for "armadillo" is tatú which is derived from the Tupi language ta "bark, armor" and tu "dense"; and used in Argentina, Bolivia, Brasil, Paraguay and Uruguay; similar names are also found in other, especially European, languages.

Other various vernacular names given are:

 quirquincho (from ) in Argentina, Bolivia, Chile, Colombia and Peru;
 cuzuco (from Nahuatl) in Costa Rica, El Salvador, Honduras and Nicaragua;
 mulita in Argentina and Uruguay;
 peludo in Argentina, Chile, Colombia and Uruguay;
 piche in Argentina, Brasil, Chile, Colombia and Paraguay;
 cachicamo in Colombia and Venezuela
 gurre in Tolima, Caldas and Antioquia, Colombia;
 jerre-jerre in Caribbean Colombia;
 jueche in southeast Mexico;
 toche in the state of Veracruz, Mexico;
 carachupa in Perú. 

ClassificationFamily Dasypodidae Subfamily Dasypodinae
 Genus Dasypus 
Nine-banded armadillo or long-nosed armadillo, Dasypus novemcinctus
Seven-banded armadillo, Dasypus septemcinctus
Southern long-nosed armadillo, Dasypus hybridus
Llanos long-nosed armadillo, Dasypus sabanicola
Greater long-nosed armadillo, Dasypus kappleri
Hairy long-nosed armadillo, Dasypus pilosus
Yepes's mulita, Dasypus yepesi
†Beautiful armadillo, Dasypus bellus
†Dasypus neogaeus
 Genus †StegotheriumFamily Chlamyphoridae'''
 Subfamily Chlamyphorinae
 Genus Calyptophractus Greater fairy armadillo, Calyptophractus retusus Genus ChlamyphorusPink fairy armadillo, Chlamyphorus truncatus Subfamily Euphractinae
 Genus Chaetophractus 
Screaming hairy armadillo, Chaetophractus vellerosusBig hairy armadillo, Chaetophractus villosusAndean hairy armadillo, Chaetophractus nationiGenus †MacroeuphractusGenus †PaleuphractusGenus †ProeuphractusGenus †DoellotatusGenus †Peltephilus †Horned armadillo, Peltephilus ferox Genus EuphractusSix-banded armadillo, Euphractus sexcinctus Genus ZaedyusPichi, Zaedyus pichiy Subfamily Tolypeutinae
 Genus †Kuntinaru Genus Cabassous 
Northern naked-tailed armadillo, Cabassous centralisChacoan naked-tailed armadillo, Cabassous chacoensisSouthern naked-tailed armadillo, Cabassous unicinctusGreater naked-tailed armadillo, Cabassous tatouay Genus PriodontesGiant armadillo, Priodontes maximus Genus TolypeutesSouthern three-banded armadillo, Tolypeutes matacusBrazilian three-banded armadillo, Tolypeutes tricinctus† indicates extinct taxon

Phylogeny
Below is a recent simplified phylogeny of the xenarthran families, which includes armadillos, based on Slater et al. (2016) and Delsuc et al. (2016). The dagger symbol, "†", denotes extinct groups.
 }}

Evolution
Recent genetic research suggests that an extinct group of giant armored mammals, the glyptodonts, should be included within the lineage of armadillos, having diverged some 35 million years ago, more recently than previously assumed.

Distribution
Like all of the Xenarthra lineages, armadillos originated in South America. Due to the continent's former isolation, they were confined there for most of the Cenozoic. The recent formation of the Isthmus of Panama allowed a few members of the family to migrate northward into southern North America by the early Pleistocene, as part of the Great American Interchange. (Some of their much larger cingulate relatives, the pampatheres and chlamyphorid glyptodonts, made the same journey.)

Today, all extant armadillo species are still present in South America. They are particularly diverse in Paraguay (where 11 species exist) and surrounding areas. Many species are endangered. Some, including four species of Dasypus, are widely distributed over the Americas, whereas others, such as Yepes's mulita, are restricted to small ranges. Two species, the northern naked-tailed armadillo and nine-banded armadillo, are found in Central America; the latter has also reached the United States, primarily in the south-central states (notably Texas), but with a range that extends as far east as North Carolina and Florida, and as far north as southern Nebraska and southern Indiana. Their range has consistently expanded in North America over the last century due to a lack of natural predators. Armadillos are increasingly documented in southern Illinois and are tracking northwards due to climate change.

Characteristics 
Size

Diet and predation
The diets of different armadillo species vary, but consist mainly of insects, grubs, and other invertebrates. Some species, however, feed almost entirely on ants and termites.

They are prolific diggers. Many species use their sharp claws to dig for food, such as grubs, and to dig dens. The nine-banded armadillo prefers to build burrows in moist soil near the creeks, streams, and arroyos around which it lives and feeds.

Armadillos have very poor eyesight, and use their keen sense of smell to hunt for food. They use their claws for digging and finding food, as well as for making their homes in burrows. They dig their burrows with their claws, making only a single corridor the width of the animal's body. They have five clawed toes on their hind feet, and three to five toes with heavy digging claws on their fore feet. Armadillos have numerous cheek teeth which are not divided into premolars and molars, but usually have no incisors or canines. The dentition of the nine-banded armadillo is P 7/7, M 1/1 = 32.

Body temperature
This is particularly true of types that specialize in using termites as their primary food source (for example, Priodontes and Tolypeutes).

Skin
The armor is formed by plates of dermal bone covered in relatively small overlapping epidermal scales called "scutes" which are composed of keratin. Most species have rigid shields over the shoulders and hips, with a number of bands separated by flexible skin covering the back and flanks. Additional armor covers the top of the head, the upper parts of the limbs, and the tail. The underside of the animal is never armored, and is simply covered with soft skin and fur. This armor-like skin appears to be an important defense for many armadillos, although most escape predators by fleeing (often into thorny patches, from which their armor protects them) or digging to safety. Only the South American three-banded armadillos (Tolypeutes) rely heavily on their armor for protection.

Defensive behavior
When threatened by a predator, Tolypeutes species frequently roll up into a ball. Other armadillo species cannot roll up because they have too many plates. The North American nine-banded armadillo tends to jump straight in the air when surprised, so consequently often collides with the undercarriage or fenders of passing vehicles to its demise.

Movement
Armadillos have short legs, but can move quite quickly.  The nine-banded armadillo is noted for its movement through water which is accomplished via two different methods: it can walk underwater for short distances, holding its breath for as long as six minutes; also, to cross larger bodies of water, it is capable of increasing its buoyancy by swallowing air, inflating its stomach and intestines.

Reproduction
Gestation lasts from 60 to 120 days, depending on species, although the nine-banded armadillo also exhibits delayed implantation, so the young are not typically born for eight months after mating. Most members of the genus Dasypus give birth to four monozygotic young (that is, identical quadruplets), but other species may have typical litter sizes that range from one to eight. The young are born with soft, leathery skin which hardens within a few weeks. They reach sexual maturity in three to twelve months, depending on the species. Armadillos are solitary animals that do not share their burrows with other adults.

Armadillos and humans

 Science and education 
Armadillos are often used in the study of leprosy, since they, along with mangabey monkeys, rabbits, and mice (on their footpads), are among the few known species that can contract the disease systemically. They are particularly susceptible due to their unusually low body temperature, which is hospitable to the leprosy bacterium, Mycobacterium leprae. Humans can acquire a leprosy infection from armadillos by handling them or consuming armadillo meat. Armadillos are a presumed vector and natural reservoir for the disease in Texas, Louisiana and Florida. Prior to the arrival of Europeans in the late 15th century, leprosy was unknown in the New World. Given that armadillos are native to the New World, at some point they must have acquired the disease from old-world humans.

The armadillo is also a natural reservoir for Chagas disease.

The nine-banded armadillo also serves science through its unusual reproductive system, in which four genetically identical offspring are born, the result of one original egg. Because they are always genetically identical, the group of four young provides a good subject for scientific, behavioral, or medical tests that need consistent biological and genetic makeup in the test subjects. This is the only reliable manifestation of polyembryony in the class Mammalia, and exists only within the genus Dasypus and not in all armadillos, as is commonly believed. Other species that display this trait include parasitoid wasps, certain flatworms, and various aquatic invertebrates.

Even though they have a leathery, tough shell, Armadillos, (mainly Dasypus) are common roadkill due to their habit of jumping 3–4 ft vertically when startled, which puts them into collision with the underside of vehicles. Wildlife enthusiasts are using the northward march of the armadillo as an opportunity to educate others about the animals, which can be a burrowing nuisance to property owners and managers.

 Culture 

Armadillo shells have traditionally been used to make the back of the charango, an Andean lute instrument.

In certain parts of Central and South America, armadillo meat is eaten; it is a popular ingredient in Oaxaca, Mexico. During the Great Depression, Americans were known to eat armadillo, known begrudgingly as "Hoover hogs", a nod to the belief that President Herbert Hoover was responsible for the economic despair facing the nation at that time.

A whimsical account of The Beginning of the Armadillos is one of the chapters of Rudyard Kipling's Just So Stories 1902 children's book. The vocal and piano duo Flanders and Swann recorded a humorous song called "The Armadillo". 

Shel Silverstein wrote a two-line poem called "Instructions" on how to bathe an armadillo in his collection A Light in the Attic''. The reference was "use one bar of soap, a whole lot of hope, and 27 pads of Brillo."

See also 
 Armadillo shoe
 Echidnas, a type of monotreme with a defensive keratin body covering
 Hedgehogs, another mammal group with defensive keratin body coverings
 Pangolins, another mammal group with defensive keratin body coverings 
 Porcupines, another mammal group with defensive keratin body coverings

References

Further reading

External links

 "Armadillo online" website hosted by zoologist Dr. Joshua Nixon
 Photographs of armadillo rolling into a ball

Armadillos
Cingulates
Extant Thanetian first appearances
Mammal common names
Rolling animals